Youkounkoun is a town in northwestern Guinea near the border with Senegal. It is located in Koundara Prefecture in the Boké Region. As of 2014 it had a population of 7,804 people.

References

External links
Satellite map at Maplandia.com

Sub-prefectures of the Boké Region